Eupithecia frequens is a moth in the  family Geometridae. It is found in the regions of Coquimbo (El Qui Province), Valparaiso (Aconcagua Province), Santiago (Santiago Province), Maule (Curico, Talca, Cauquenes, and Linares provinces) and Los Lagos (Valdivia Province) in Chile. The habitat consists of the Coquimban Desert, Central Andean Cordillera, Central Valley and Northern Valdivian Forest biotic provinces.

The length of the forewings is about 8.5 mm for males and 8.5-9.5 mm for females. The forewings are dark brown, with grey and blackish brown scales and with reddish brown scaling along the cubital vein and on the veins in the outer part of the wing. The hindwings are brownish grey, with numerous brown scales. Adults have been recorded on wing from September to January and in April and June.

References

Moths described in 1882
frequens
Moths of South America
Endemic fauna of Chile